The 2008 Saudi Crown Prince Cup Final was the 33rd final of the Crown Prince Cup. It took place on 7 March 2008 at the King Fahd International Stadium in Riyadh, Saudi Arabia and was contested between Al-Hilal and Al-Ettifaq. It was Al-Ettifaq's fourth Crown Prince Cup final and Al-Hilal's eighth. This was the first meeting between these two clubs in the final. It was Al-Ettifaq's first final since 2001 and Al-Hilal's third final in four years.

Al-Hilal won the match 2–0 to claim their seventh Crown Prince Cup title. It was also their third title in four years, following those in 2005 and 2006.

Teams

Venue

The King Fahd International Stadium was announced as the host of the final venue. This was the eighth Crown Prince Cup final hosted in the King Fahd International Stadium following those in 1992, 1994, 1998, 2003, 2004, 2005, and 2006.

The King Fahd International Stadium was built in 1982 and was opened in 1987. The stadium was used as a venue for the 1992, 1995, and the 1997 editions of the FIFA Confederations Cup. Its current capacity is 68,752 and it is used by the Saudi Arabia national football team, Al-Nassr, Al-Shabab, and major domestic matches.

Background
Al-Hilal reached their eighth final after a 1–0 aggregate win against Al-Shabab. This was Al-Hilal's third final in the four years.

Al-Ettifaq reached their fourth final, after a 4–3 aggregate win against defending champions Al-Ahli. They reached their first final since 2001 when they finished as runners-up losing to Al-Ittihad.

This was the first meeting between these two sides in the Crown Prince Cup final. The two teams met each other six times in the finals of other competitions, twice in the King Cup and four times in the Federation Cup. Al-Ettifaq won twice in the King Cup and once in the Federation Cup, while Al-Hilal 3 times in the Federation Cup. The two teams played each other four times in the season prior to the final, twice in the 2007 Gulf Club Champions Cup, once in the League and once in the Federation Cup. Al-Ettifaq defeated Al-Hilal 2–1 on aggregate in the semi-finals of the Gulf Club Champions Cup. Al-Hilal defeated Al-Ettifaq 2–0 in both the League and Federation Cup.

Road to the final 

Key: (H) = Home; (A) = Away

Match

Details

See also

2007–08 Saudi Crown Prince Cup
2007–08 Saudi Premier League

References

External links

Sports competitions in Saudi Arabia
March 2008 sports events in Asia
Al Hilal SFC matches
Ettifaq FC